CITS-DT (channel 14) is a religious television station in Hamilton, Ontario, Canada, serving as the flagship station of Yes TV. Owned by Crossroads Christian Communications, the station has studios on North Service Road (adjacent to Highway 403) in Burlington, and its transmitter is located on the CHCH Television Tower at 481 First Road West in Stoney Creek.

CITS-DT also operates rebroadcasters in Ottawa and London, extending the station's coverage to almost all of Southern Ontario as well as portions of Western New York.

History

On December 4, 1996, the Canadian Radio-television and Telecommunications Commission (CRTC) denied Crossroads Christian Communications a licence to operate a religious television station in Burlington. Two years later on April 2, 1998, the company became successful in obtaining a licence for Hamilton, beating out Trinity Television Inc. for the licence. CITS-TV first signed on the air on September 30 of that year, as a religious independent station. It had planned to launch two weeks earlier on September 14, but the sign-on date was pushed back to allow cable providers to make changes to some of their channel designations.

Throughout the years, CITS-TV expanded its coverage across southern Ontario by adding rebroadcast transmitters in London and Ottawa and by securing carriage on various cable providers across Ontario and Canada and on satellite.

CTS was rebranded as "Yes TV" on September 1, 2014. The rebranding coincides with the introduction of several secular programs into the schedule such as American Idol, Wheel of Fortune and Jeopardy!.

Programming
Yes TV airs programming intended for family viewing, mostly based on Christian values, including dramas, comedies, mini-series and reality, game, and talk shows; although Yes TV also features shows on political commentary and other religions, including Judaism, Islam and Sikhism. Yes TV also airs secular mainstream programs during prime time hours. It is governed by the CRTC's Religious Broadcast Regulations and follows a policy of not airing shows containing "coarse language, gratuitous violence or explicit sexual scenes."

First-run syndicated programming on CITS, some of which is shared with other Yes TV stations, includes Wheel of Fortune, Jeopardy!, Hot Bench and Judge Judy. Most of these are timed to air on CITS for maximum simultaneous substitution benefits to coincide with the timing of the airings in the nearest American market, Buffalo, New York: Hot Bench on WKBW-TV, Judge Judy on WUTV and Wheel and Jeopardy on WIVB-TV.

Technical information

Subchannel

Analogue-to-digital conversion
CITS-TV began broadcasting its digital signal on UHF channel 35 in January 2008. CITS shut down is analogue signal, over UHF channel 36, on August 31, 2011, the official date in which Canadian television stations in CRTC-designated mandatory markets transitioned from analogue to digital broadcasts; The station relocated its digital signal from its pre-transition UHF channel 35 to its former analogue-era UHF channel 36 for post-transition operations. CITS and its digital rebroadcast transmitters switched to digital as follows: Ottawa repeater CITS-DT-1's digital signal remained on its pre-transition UHF channel 42, remapping to virtual channel 42.1 via PSIP; while London repeater CITS-DT-2's digital signal remained on UHF channel 14, remapping to virtual channel 14.1 via PSIP.

Spectrum reallocation
As part of the joint effort between the United States and Canada to repurpose the 600 MHz band, CITS-DT was required to change its broadcast frequencies in all three markets that it serves. On July 29, 2019, the Hamilton transmitter (CITS-DT) moved from UHF 36 to UHF 14, while the London transmitter (CITS-DT-2) moved from UHF 14 to UHF 19. On May 25, 2020, the Ottawa transmitter (CITS-DT-1) moved from UHF 42 to UHF 15. In all three cases, the PSIP virtual channel is identical to the physical channel, appended with the .1 decimal.

Transmitters

References

External links
CITS-DT ("Yes TV Ontario") official website
 
CITS-DT history

ITS-DT
ITS-DT
ITS-DT
Burlington, Ontario
Television channels and stations established in 1998
1998 establishments in Ontario